The Walcheren Campaign was an unsuccessful British expedition to the Netherlands in 1809 intended to open another front in the Austrian Empire's struggle with France during the War of the Fifth Coalition.  Sir John Pitt, 2nd Earl of Chatham, was the commander of the expedition, with the missions of capturing Flushing and Antwerp in the Netherlands and enabling navigation of the Scheldt River. Some 39,000 soldiers and 15,000 horses, together with field artillery and two siege trains, crossed the North Sea and landed at Walcheren on 30July. This was the largest British expedition of that year, larger than the army serving in the Peninsular War in Portugal. Nevertheless, it failed to achieve any of its goals. The Walcheren Campaign involved little fighting, but heavy losses from the sickness popularly dubbed "Walcheren Fever". Although more than 4,000 British troops died during the expedition, only 106 died in combat; the survivors withdrew on 9December.

Background 
In July 1809, the British decided to seal the mouth of the Scheldt to prevent the port of Antwerp being used as a base against them. The primary aim of the campaign was to destroy the French fleet thought to be in Flushing whilst providing a diversion for the hard-pressed Austrians. However, the Battle of Wagram had already occurred before the start of the campaign and the Austrians had effectively already lost the war.

John Pitt, 2nd Earl of Chatham commanded the army, whilst Sir Richard Strachan commanded the navy, the full expeditionary force of 37 ships, the greatest to have ever left England, leaving The Downs on 28 July. Commanders included Hugh Downman, Edward Codrington, Amelius Beauclerk, William Charles Fahie, George Cockburn and George Dundas.

Campaign 
As a first move, the British seized the swampy island of Walcheren at the mouth of river Scheldt, as well as South Beveland island, both in the present-day Netherlands. The British troops soon began to suffer from "Walcheren fever", due to the symptoms present most likely a combination of malaria, typhus, typhoid and dysentery. Within a month of seizing the island, they had over 8,000 fever cases. The medical provisions for the expedition proved inadequate despite reports that an occupying French force had lost 80% of its numbers a few years earlier, also due to disease. Once it had been decided to garrison Walcheren Island in September 1809, Pitt was replaced by Lieutenant-general Eyre Coote who in October was replaced by Lieutenant-general George Don.

At the time of the initial landings, the French forces were characterized by a divided command over a motley crew of units manned by soldiers of many nationalities spanning French-occupied Europe. There were a few French units among those present considered to be of inferior quality as they were manned by the physically infirm and dregs of the training depots.

However, on 10 August 1809, as reinforcements began flowing into the invasion zone, Napoleon approved the appointment of Marshal Jean-Baptiste Bernadotte, the Prince of Ponte Corvo, who had recently resigned his command after incurring Napoleon's displeasure at the Battle of Wagram as overall commander of the invasion zone. Bernadotte had returned to Paris and was sent to defend the Netherlands by the council of ministers. His arrival gave the French a much-needed unity of command and he brought with him a genius for organization and training. Bernadotte led the reinforced and reorganized French forces competently and although the British had captured Flushing on the day of his arrival to the war zone after a ferocious bombardment, and the surrounding towns on 15 August, he had already ordered the French fleet to Antwerp and heavily reinforced the city. The French numbers were such that the main objective for the British, Antwerp, was now out of reach. The expedition was called off in early September. Around 12,000 troops stayed on Walcheren, but by October only 5,500 remained fit for duty.

Aftermath 
In all, the British government spent almost £8 million on the campaign. Along with the 4,000 men who had died during the campaign, almost 12,000 were still ill by February 1810 and many others remained permanently weakened. Those sent to the Peninsular War to join Wellington's army caused a permanent doubling of the sick lists there.

This campaign led to the plant known as Thanet cress being introduced to Britain in the sick men's bedding.

The debacle was also a source of acute political embarrassment, in particular for Lord Castlereagh upon whom the former United Irishman, Peter Finnerty, who at the invitation of Sir Home Popham accompanied the expedition as a special correspondent for The Morning Chronicle, heaped the blame.

Order of battle 
The below order of battle is for 28 July.

British Expeditionary Force to Walcheren

Corps of Observation of Holland

Naval forces 
A fleet of around 40 vessels, including sixteen 74 gun warships of the third rate, participated under the overall command of Strachan. A number of smaller vessels including customs-house and excise cutters were also involved, as was a packet ship. The City of London, Loyal Greenwich, and Royal Harbour River Fencibles also contributed men to the expedition.

Irish legion 
The 1st battalion of the Irish Legion (raised by the French for an invasion of Ireland that never happened) was stationed in Flushing during the assault and received its baptism of fire there. It fought a rear guard action for several days but the battalion was almost completely captured. The Legion's brass band followed by the Irish battalion led the surrendered French garrison out of the town. However, a small party of Irishmen escaped and went into hiding with the battalion's cherished imperial eagle, and after a few days they crossed the Scheldt River and escaped. Commandant Lawless was presented to Napoleon and he together with Captain O'Reilly received the Légion d'honneur in gratitude.

See also 
 Battle of the Basque Roads

References

Notes

Citations

Sources

External links 
 The British Expeditionary Force to Walcheren: 1809
 

Conflicts in 1809
Campaigns of the Napoleonic Wars
Battles of the War of the Fifth Coalition
19th-century military history of the United Kingdom
Military campaigns involving France
1809 in France
Walcheren Campaign
Walcheren Campaign
Amphibious operations
Kingdom of Holland
Amphibious operations involving the United Kingdom